Stokes Inlet is an inlet in the Goldfields-Esperance region of Western Australia.

Thick bushland and paperbark trees surround the inlet and grow down to the waters edge. It is in a largely unmodified condition.
The inlet functions primarily as a result of wave energy and is a wave dominated estuary.

Geography 

The mouth of the river is in the middle of Dunster Castle Bay; it is closed by a sandbar that cuts the estuary off from the sea and only opens every few years. As a result, the salinity and water level fluctuate greatly dependent upon the amount of evaporation and river flow.

Flora 
The aquatic flora of the estuary are dominated by the small green algae Polyphysa peniculus, the stonewort Lamprothamnium papulosum, and the seagrass Ruppia megacarpa.
The waterbody of the inlet is fringed with salt water paperbarks with sedges and samphire common along the sandy sections.

Fauna 
Marine species flourish at times when the bar is open; blue manna crabs, juvenile prawns, cockles and mussels have all been identified in the inlet. 
Many fish species inhabit the estuary, such as the common minnow, hardyheads, gobies, and larger species such as black bream and sea mullet.

References 

Inlets of Western Australia
South coast of Western Australia